Allemagne is the French name for Germany

It may also refer to:

Communes in France
 Allemagne-en-Provence, in Alpes-de-Haute-Provence
 Fleury-sur-Orne (named Allemagne prior to 1917), in Calvados

See also
Aleman (surname)